The Hazardous Service Medal was a single-grade decoration awarded by South Vietnam. Established in 1964, the medal was awarded to military personnel by the Chief of the Joint General Staff, Republic of Vietnam Armed Forces. The medal could be awarded posthumously and also to members of allied military forces.

Criteria
The Hazardous Service Medal was awarded to military personnel who met one of the following requirements:
Displayed heroism in the protection of government properties or the life of government officials.
Endured a long period of danger to accomplish a strategic mission in a remote area under constant enemy threat.
Proven enthusiasm and determination in the accomplishment of a relatively dangerous mission not involving direct combat participation.

See also 
Orders, decorations, and medals of South Vietnam

References

Military awards and decorations of Vietnam
Awards established in 1964